John Erlander  (April 7, 1826 - February 14, 1917) was a Swedish born, American businessman and founder of Rockford Union Furniture Company.

Biography
John Erlander  was born Johan Jönsson, in Slätthög, Kronoberg County in Småland, Sweden. His father, Jöns Petterson, was a carpenter.  Erlander  emigrated to the United States in April, 1854  with his sister Kajsa Jönsdotter, and his brother Peter Magnus Erlander (1824-1903).

John Erlander first settled in Chicago where he learned to operate a sewing machine. In 1855 he moved to Rockford, Illinois where he worked as a tailor. In 1861, he entered into a partnership with Sven August Johnson. They open a successful tailoring and men's clothing shop.  The partners remained in business until 1885 when Erlander sold his half of the business to Johnson.

Erlander was a lay delegate to the meeting at Jefferson Prairie Settlement during June 1860 at which the Augustana Evangelical Lutheran Church was organized. He would live to be the last surviving member at that historic meeting.

Rockford Union Furniture Company was organized in 1876.  Erlander was elected president. Jonas Peters, Erlander's brother-in-law, served as Treasurer/Manager, and Pehr August Peterson was elected company Secretary. Rockford Union Furniture Company was a cooperative association with members helping to raise the initial capital for the business. It was the first of 25 area furniture factories that were formed as cooperatives.

John Erlander was involved in several other business ventures and provided leadership in the Rockford community. He served on the boards of the Excelsior Furniture Company, Central Furniture Company and Rockford Brick Company. He was also one of the primary organizers of the Swedish Mutual Fire Insurance Company and was a stockholder in Manufacturer's National Bank.

Erlander Home Museum
John Erlander built a 14-room home in 1871. The twelve-room brick home was situated in the Haight Village historic district of Rockford. It is now the headquarters of the Swedish Historical Society of Rockford.

Personal life
Erlander has been married twice. His first wife, whom he married December 24, 1855, was Stina Kajsa Pettersdotter, a fellow immigrant from Småland,  Sweden. Following her death, he married her sister, Ingrid Stina Pettersdotter (1833–1915) on December 12, 1857. One son was born in the first marriage, and five sons and two daughters were born in the second.

John Erlander died during 1917 at 90 years of age. Both he and his wife Ingrid Petersdotter Erlander were buried at the Scandinavian cemetery in Rockford.

References

External links
Swedish Historical Society of Rockford
Erlander Home Museum
Picture of Erlander Home

1826 births
1917 deaths
People from Alvesta Municipality
American Lutherans
People from Rockford, Illinois
Swedish emigrants to the United States
19th-century American businesspeople
19th-century Lutherans